Ardvourlie Castle is a 19th-century country house on Harris, one of the Western Isles off the north-west coast of Scotland. The house was built beside Loch Seaforth in 1863 as a hunting lodge on the North Harris Estate, for Charles Murray, 7th Earl of Dunmore, the then owner of the island.  It is a category B listed building.

It was for sale in 2009.

References

External links
 
 Harris, Ardvourlie Castle Canmore entry
 Ardvourlie Castle, Isle of Harris, Scotland
 Stalking in the Outer Hebrides

Castles in the Outer Hebrides
Houses in the Outer Hebrides
Category B listed buildings in the Outer Hebrides
Harris, Outer Hebrides
Hunting lodges in Scotland